Street Drum Corps is an American rock band formed in Los Angeles in 2004 by Bobby Alt, of S.T.U.N. and Faculty X; Adam Alt, of Circus Minor; and Frank Zummo, of TheStart. To date the group have released four albums and have been part of tours such as Van's Warped Tour, Taste of Chaos, Thirty Seconds to Mars's Into the Wild Tour and Linkin Park's Projekt Revolution.

The group uses instruments such as drum kits, garbage cans, hand drums, acoustic, buckets, kitchenware, recycled aluminium, rain barrels, marching band equipment, and even power tools to produce a grinding effect during live shows and have performed with the likes of Thirty Seconds to Mars, Stomp, No Doubt, Bad Religion, Good Charlotte, Linkin Park, Atreyu, Strung Out, Alexisonfire and Deftones.  Bert McCracken of The Used and Airin Older of Sugarcult have performed with Street Drum Corps several times, and shared the stage with them for the song "Flaco 81".

History

Street Drum Corps (2004–2006) 
Street Drum Corps was formed in Los Angeles by drummers Bobby and Adam Alt and Frank Zummo. Prior to forming, Bobby and Adam had a show called Experiment, where they played at schools and camps, where they played with drum kits, garbage cans and hand drums. Drummer Zummo, who had moved to L.A., also had a similar project in Pennsylvania called Repercussion and after catching one of the Experiment shows and drums into the tracks speaking to both Bobby and Adam, the three decided to get together eventually forming the group. The group's first release was a cover of "Happy Christmas (War Is Over)" featuring The Used frontman Bert McCracken released in 2005. Joining the Van's Warped Tour, the band was featured in a documentary, "Wake Up Screaming", about the Warped Tour experience.  The group entered the studio to record their debut album, produced by Limp Bizkit's DJ Lethal, which featured guest musician John Sawicki of Stomp. The Band said that their primary influences for Street Drum Corps were Adam & The Ants, Oingo Boingo, Siouxsie and the Banshees, the Creatures, Jane's Addiction, and Mötley Crüe. In November, System of a Down guitarist Daron Malakian was said to be contributing a track to the group's album, however this did not happen, and the group were added to the lineup of the 2006 Taste of Chaos tour scheduled to kick off on February 15. The track "Flaco 81" was included on the "Best of the Taste of Chaos" album released in January 2006. Street Drum Corps was released on February 21, 2006, via Warcon Enterprises. They appeared on Late Night with Conan O'Brien in March 2006.

We Are Machines (2007–2008) 
In 2007, the band were announced as part of the Van's Warped Tour touring through 2007 to 2008 where they were joined onstage by The Used during the shows. Street Drum Corps released their second album We Are Machines, produced by Street Drum Corps producer DJ Lethal, on April 1, 2008, through Lethal Dose Records which featured guest appearances by TheStart, Tor Kjeka, Adrian Young, David Adams, Sporty O and previous guest John Sawicki of Stomp. They were also announced as part of Linkin Park's Projekt Revolution tour, along with Chris Cornell, The Bravery and Ashes Divide, featuring on the Revolution Stage. They joined Linkin Park for performances of four songs: "One Step Closer", No More Sorrow, "Bleed it Out", and "What I've Done". In November the band opened up for Mötley Crüe at the Palladium in Los Angeles.

Big Noise and Children of the Drum (2009–2014) 
After being signed by Interscope Records, the group began recording the follow-up to We Are Machines in the Summer of 2009. The group appeared on The Tonight Show with Conan O'Brien in December performing with Thirty Seconds to Mars.

In January 2010, the band were confirmed as the main support for Thirty Seconds to Mars on their Into The Wild Tour where they were previewing songs from their upcoming album such as "Marry Me", "Terror Surrounding", "Come Alive", "Play on It", "I Miss You", "Knock Me Out" and "Little Ones". On March 17, the group announced that they had been added to the lineup of The Bamboozle festival taking place on March 27. In May, it was announced that the group would be making an appearance on American Idol on May 19, performing with Travis Garland, who would be singing his new single, "Believe".

Discography

Albums

Studio albums

Compilation albums

Soundtracks

Singles

Other appearances

Videography

Video albums

Music videos

Unreleased songs

Members

Band members 
Bobby Alt – vocals, drums
Adam Alt – drums
Frank Zummo – drums

Live members 
Justin Imamura AKA The Bambino, Gas Mask Man Percussion
Scott Zant guitar
Tyler William Johnson
•J. Tyler Trammel percussion

See also 
List of Warped Tour lineups by year
The Bamboozle Festival lineup 2010

References

External links 

Official website

"Wrecks" artist commentary
Burning Stars Interview with Frank – April 17, 2008

Musical groups established in 2004
Alternative rock groups from California
Musical groups from Los Angeles
Interscope Records artists